The inter-Korean Peace House is a venue for peace talks between North and South Korea.

The Peace House or House of Peace may also refer to:
 Peace House (New York City)
 the Al Rajabi House settlement (also called Beit HaShalom) in Hebron
 a pilgrim guest house in Fátima, Portugal, Domus Pacis
 House of Peace Synagogue in Columbia, South Carolina
 Dar as-Salam ("house of peace"); see Divisions of the world in Islam#Dar al-Islam
 Dar es Salaam ("house of peace"), a major city in Tanzania